Bob Simmons may refer to:

Bob Simmons (stunt man) (1923–1987), renowned stunt man for the James Bond film series
Bob Simmons (surfer) (1919–1954), early surfing pioneer
Bob Simmons (offensive lineman) (born 1954), American football player
Bob Simmons (American football coach) (born 1948), former football coach for Oklahoma State
B.o.B (Bobby Ray Simmons, Jr., born 1988), rapper

See also
Robert Simmons (disambiguation)
Bobby Simmons (born 1980), basketball player